Jeff Halevy is an American author, public health advocate, and fitness contributor to various media outlets. He is the host of a cable television program Workout From Within with Jeff Halevy. Workout From Within with Jeff Halevy and was a correspondent on NBC's Today Show from 2013 to 2014. In 2011, Halevy joined Michelle Obama's Let's Move! campaign, and launched a pilot run of his Our Power program in Newark, NJ.

References

External links
 Let’s Move! Newark official website, with February 23, 2012, post about Halevy's Our Power program
 Workout from Within with Jeff Halevy

American male writers
Fitness and figure competitors
1979 births
Living people
HuffPost bloggers